Deux Montagnes is French for "Two Mountains", and can represent:

 Lac des Deux Montagnes, a lake in the Greater Montreal Area
 Deux-Montagnes, Quebec, a municipality in Canada, named after the lake
 Deux-Montagnes Regional County Municipality, Quebec, a regional government (county) in Canada, with county seat at Deux-Montagnes
 Deux-Montagnes Line (AMT), a commuter train line in Greater Montreal that ends at Deux-Montagnes
 Deux-Montagnes (AMT), a commuter train station, and terminus of the commuter train line of the same name
 Deux-Montagnes (provincial electoral district), a Quebec provincial riding that encompasses the municipality of the same name
 Deux-Montagnes (electoral district), a former Canadian federal riding that encompassed the municipality of the same name
 Argenteuil—Deux-Montagnes, a former Canadian federal riding
 Blainville—Deux-Montagnes, a former Canadian federal riding

See also
Two Mountains (disambiguation)